The National Academies Communication Award was an annual prize bestowed in recognition of creative works that help the public understand topics in science, engineering or medicine. The awards were established in 2003 and administered by the Keck Futures Initiative, a project of the National Academy of Sciences, the National Academy of Engineering and the Institute of Medicine that was funded by the W.M. Keck Foundation.  The National Academies Keck Futures Initiative Ended in 2017 and the final report was published in 2018.  The Awards continued through 2019. A $20,000 prize was awarded in each of four categories: Book, Film/Radio/TV, Magazine/Newspaper, and Online. The Online category was created in 2009.

In 2022, the National Academies launched a new awards program to recognize and develop excellence in science communication by research scientists and by early career, local, and freelance science journalists.  The program will provide winners with cash awards as well as training and resources to further expand their communication skills.

List of recipients

Book

Film/Radio/TV

Magazine/Newspaper

Online

References

Science communication awards
Awards established in 2003